The Killer is a 2017 Brazilian western created and directed by Marcelo Galvão, starring Diogo Morgado, Nill Marcondes, Deto Montenegro, Maria de Medeiros and Étienne Chicot.

Principal photography began in August, 2016. The film was distributed by Netflix, premiering on 10 November 2017.

Plot
Set between the 1910s and 1940s, the film follows Shaggy (Diogo Morgado), a feared killer in the state of Pernambuco. Shaggy, raised by a local bandit named Seven Ears (Deto Montenegro) who found him as an abandoned baby, grows up in the wilderness, completely isolated from civilization. Now an adult, he finally goes to town to look for Seven Ears who has disappeared, but instead finds a place ruled by the tyrannical Monsieur Blanchard (Étienne Chicot), a Frenchman who runs the precious stones trade and previously employed Seven Ears as an assassin.

Cast
 Diogo Morgado as Shaggy
 Nill Marcondes
 Deto Montenegro as Seven Ears
 Maria de Medeiros
 Étienne Chicot as Monsieur Blanchard
 Mel Lisboa
 Daniela Galli
 Igor Cotrim
 Thaís Cabral
 Will Roberts as the American bounty hunter Gringo

Production
On August 5, 2016, Netflix announced the film's director, cast, plot and that principal photography on the film would begin in the same month.

References

External links
 
 

2017 films
Brazilian Western (genre) films
Films set in Brazil
Films shot in Brazil
2010s Portuguese-language films
Portuguese-language Netflix original films
2017 Western (genre) films
Films about cangaço